Chris Cook (born December 23, 1971) is an American professional race car driver and driving instructor, who instructs at the Bob Bondurant School of High Performance Driving and competes irregularly in NASCAR and other racing series, specializing in road course racing as a road course ringer.

Racing career
Cook was the youngest driver to become a chief instructor at the Bob Bondurant School of High Performance Driving. He has competed in the IMSA Firestone Firehawk Endurance Championship and in late model stock cars at Nashville Speedway USA, as well as in selected NASCAR events, and in the Formula D championship. Cook is best known in drifting for a wreck at the 2007 NOPI Drift Los Angeles in which his Dodge Viper flipped, knocking Cook unconscious.

After making a name for himself as an instructor for NASCAR drivers in road course racing, including instructing Tony Stewart in the art of road course driving, Cook made his debut in the NASCAR Nextel Cup Series in 2005 at Infineon Raceway, driving for Joe Nemechek and finishing 28th. He failed to qualify for several other races in 2005, 2006 and 2011 before qualifying for the 2011 Sprint Cup Series race at Infineon, substituting for Tomy Drissi in the Max Q Motorsports #37, and finishing 27th. He is one of the drivers referred to as a "road course ringer", specialist drivers who often replace regular NASCAR drivers at the two road course races on the tour schedule.

Cook has also competed in twelve races in the NASCAR Nationwide Series (formerly the NASCAR Busch Series) between 1999 and 2009, with a best finish of 20th at Autódromo Hermanos Rodríguez in Mexico City in 2006 while driving for John McNelly.

Cook has also competed in the 24 Hours of Daytona, running for Rick Ware Racing in the 2012 edition of the event; he finished 38th in the race. Later in 2012 he returned to the Sprint Cup Series, driving the No. 19 Toyota for Humphrey Smith Racing at Sonoma Raceway, finishing 42nd; he also drove for Rick Ware Racing in the Nationwide Series at Watkins Glen International in August.

In 2018, Cook returned to the Monster Energy NASCAR Cup Series with Ware, driving his No. 51 entry.

Motorsports career results

NASCAR
(key) (Bold – Pole position awarded by qualifying time. Italics – Pole position earned by points standings or practice time. * – Most laps led.)

Monster Energy Cup Series

Xfinity Series

 Season still in progress
 Ineligible for series points

24 Hours of Daytona
(key)

References

External links
 
 

Living people
1971 births
Racing drivers from Phoenix, Arizona
24 Hours of Daytona drivers
NASCAR drivers
Formula D drivers
Rolex Sports Car Series drivers
Trans-Am Series drivers